is a Japanese voice actor from Tokyo. He is affiliated with I'm Enterprise.

Biography
In 2020, Ōtsuka was one of the recipients of the Best New Actor Award at the 14th Seiyu Awards.

Filmography

Television animation
2016
Amanchu!

2017
Twin Angel Break
In Another World With My Smartphone
Magical Circle Guru Guru - Demon Singer

2018
Golden Kamuy
Last Period
The Thousand Musketeers
Run with the Wind - Kakeru Kurahara

2019
Dimension High School - Ryusei Midorigaoka
Endro!
Namu Amida Butsu! Rendai Utena - Māra
Stars Align - Satoshi Ashitaka
Beastars - Collot, Tem

2020
Sleepy Princess in the Demon Castle - Poseidon
Talentless Nana - Moguo's henchman B
Noblesse - Takeo
Haikyū!! (Land vs Sky OVA) - Naoyasu Kuguri

2021
Bottom-tier Character Tomozaki - Daichi Matsumoto
Shadows House - Gerald

2022
Trapped in a Dating Sim: The World of Otome Games Is Tough for Mobs - Leon Fou Bartfort

2023
Technoroid Overmind - Auru
Malevolent Spirits - Hyōma Kunato
Flaglia - Mel
Oshi no Ko - Aqua
AI no Idenshi - Hikaru Sudō
Synduality - Kanata

Video games
Brown Dust (2017) - Cry
Ash Tale: Kaze no Tairiku (2019) - Link
Namu Amida Butsu! Rendai Utena (2019) - Māra
Luciano Dōmei (2019) - Seven
Angelique Luminarise (2021) - Kanata

Animated films
Flavors of Youth (2018) - Limo (Rimo)
Seven Days War (2019) - Hiroto Honjō

Web anime
Monster Sonic! D'Artagnan no Idol Sengen
A.I.C.O. -Incarnation-

References

External links
Official agency profile 

1992 births
21st-century Japanese male actors
I'm Enterprise voice actors
Japanese male video game actors
Japanese male voice actors
Living people
Male voice actors from Tokyo
Seiyu Award winners